The Belleville Bobcats were a Junior "B" ice hockey team.  The Bobcats played in the Metro Junior B Hockey League.

History
The Belleville Bobcats were first formed in 1972 as a member of the Metro Junior "B" league.
In 1980 the team won the Metro Championship.  With the founding of the OHL's Belleville Bulls, the Bobcats moved west to Trenton, and became the Trenton Bobcats.  However, after uneven performance while in Trenton, the team returned to Belleville in 1987. After two seasons, the Bobcats moved to Wellington in 1989 and merged into the Wellington Dukes. 
The Bobcats were Metro "B" Champions and Sutherland Cup All-Ontario Junior "B" Champions in 1980. This team was owned and operated by Vern Nutley.

Season-by-season results

Sutherland Cup appearances
1980: Belleville Bobcats defeated Windsor Bulldogs 4-games-to-none

References

External links
OHA Website

Defunct ice hockey teams in Canada
Ice hockey teams in Ontario
Sport in Belleville, Ontario
1972 establishments in Ontario
1989 disestablishments in Ontario
Ice hockey clubs established in 1972